Harry Cobe (December 17, 1885, Manchester, New Hampshire – July 24, 1966, East Candia, New Hampshire) was an American racecar driver. He lived in East Candia at the time of his death.

Indy 500 results

References

1885 births
1966 deaths
Sportspeople from Manchester, New Hampshire
Indianapolis 500 drivers
Racing drivers from New Hampshire
People from Candia, New Hampshire
Sportspeople from Rockingham County, New Hampshire